William McFarlane may refer to:

Willie Macfarlane (1890–1961), Scottish golfer
Willie McFarlane (athlete), winner of the New Year Sprint in 1933 and 1934
Willie MacFarlane (footballer, born 1930) (1930–2010), Scottish football player and manager (Hibernian)
William McFarlane (1890s footballer), played for Port Vale FC in 1893
William D. McFarlane (1894–1980), United States Representative from Texas
Willie McFarlane (1923–1998), Scottish football player (Heart of Midlothian)

See also
William McFarland (disambiguation)